Gábor Kulcsar is a Hungarian sprint canoer who competed in the late 1980s. He won two medals at the ICF Canoe Sprint World Championships with a gold (K-2 10000 m: 1986) and a silver (K-4 10000 m: 1989).

References

Hungarian male canoeists
Living people
Year of birth missing (living people)
ICF Canoe Sprint World Championships medalists in kayak
20th-century Hungarian people